Plica kathleenae,  Kathleen's treerunner, is a species of South American lizard in the family Tropiduridae. The species is found in Guyana.

References

Plica
Lizards of South America
Reptiles of Guyana
Reptiles described in 2013